The Liberal Unification Party is a political party in South Korea established on March 3, 2016. Until 2020, it was known as the Christian Liberty Party, and following that until 14 June 2021 as the Christian Liberty Unification Party. Representatives of a range of Christian organizations including the Christian Council of Korea and the Communion of Churches in Korea attended the party's founding convention.

The Party has undergone many name changes. From March 2016 until March 2020, it was known as the Christian Liberty Party. A few days later, it changed its name to Christian Liberty Unification Party. Again, on 14 June 2021, the Party renamed to the National Revolutionary Party. On 10 April 2022, the Party came to its current name of the Liberal Unification Party.

Election results

Legislative elections 
The party had one representative in the 19th National Assembly, Lee Yun-seok, formerly a member of the Minjoo Party of Korea. Announcing his defection to the new party, Lee stated that the Korean church was being threatened by the intrusion of homosexuality and Islamic culture. The party also promotes the restoration of laws against adultery. In a party advertisement for the 2016 parliamentary elections, actress Seo Jung-hee stated that "the revival of adultery law is a quintessential issue", and that voters should "support [the] CLP to protect our families from homosexuality and Muslims." While campaigning during the 20th session of the National Assembly, the CLUP issued leaflets distributed to Korean households that made Islamophobic statements, claiming that Muslims in Korea will make Korea a "terrorist state", that Muslims will rape Korean women, and that they pose a security threat to the nation.

The CLUP was represented in the 20th Session of the National Assembly with one MP: Lee Eun-Jae. Lee Eun-Jae is a former parliamentarian in the 18th and 20th Session. In 2008 18th National Assembly election, she was elected as a proportional representative of the Grand National Party. During her time, she was estranged from the ruling conservative party for physically assaulting Unified Progressive Party MP Lee Jung-Hee. On March 23, 2020, Lee Eun-Jae left the main conservative party and became the first parliamentarian for the CLUP. However, she was swiftly kicked out because it was found out that Lee is actually Buddhist. Lee then worked for the Korea Economic Party (한국경제당) and is no longer a member of parliament, losing the 2020 South Korean legislative election.

Lee Yun-seok and Lee Eun-jae only had brief stints with the Party, both leaving the Party within six months and never representing the CLUP in an election campaign.

Electoral results

Logos

References 

2016 establishments in South Korea
Anti-Islam political parties
Conservative parties in South Korea
Organizations that oppose LGBT rights
Far-right politics in South Korea
Ilminist parties
Right-wing populism in South Korea
Political parties established in 2016
Political parties in South Korea
Protestant political parties
Christian political parties
Evangelicalism in South Korea
Anti-Islam sentiment in South Korea